Ethel Barrymore (born Ethel Mae Blythe; 1879–1959) was an American actress of stage, screen and radio. She came from a family of actors; she was the middle child of Maurice Barrymore and Georgie Drew Barrymore, and had two brothers, Lionel and John. Reluctant to pursue her parents' career, the loss of financial support following the death of Louisa Lane Drew, caused Barrymore to give up her dream of becoming a concert pianist and instead earn a living on the stage. Barrymore's first Broadway role, alongside her uncle John Drew, Jr., was in The Imprudent Young Couple (1895). She soon found success, particularly after an invitation from William Gillette to appear on stage in his 1897 London production of Secret Service. Barrymore was soon popular with English society, and she had a number of romantic suitors, including Laurence Irving, the dramatist. His father, Henry Irving, cast her in The Bells (1897) and Peter the Great (1898).

On her return to America in 1898, Barrymore was lauded by the press and public and, under Charles Frohman's management, she appeared in Catherine (1898) and Captain Jinks of the Horse Marines (1901) on Broadway. The latter play was a success, and Barrymore received particular praise. She went on to have a series of similarly popular roles in Cousin Kate (1903), Alice-Sit-by-the-Fire (1905), Lady Frederick (1908) and Déclassée (1920), among others. After a series of less well-received roles in the early 1920s, she returned to popularity with her role as the sophisticated spouse of a philandering husband in The Constant Wife (1927). In 1928 the Ethel Barrymore Theatre was opened in her honor, and she appeared in its inaugural production, The Kingdom of God.

Barrymore began her film career in The Nightingale in 1914, followed by a series of other silent films, but she never dedicated herself to the medium fully. When opportunities for the right stage roles declined in the 1930s and she encountered financial difficulties, she appeared in her first talking film, Rasputin and the Empress (1932)—in which both her brothers also starred—and began radio broadcasts on the Blue Network with The Ethel Barrymore Theater. In the 1940s she had a last stage triumph in the long-running The Corn Is Green (1942), in which she had "perhaps her most acclaimed role", according to her biographer, Benjamin McArthur. Her film work became increasingly prominent in the 1940s and 1950s, and she won the Academy Award for Best Supporting Actress for None but the Lonely Heart (1944). She received subsequent Academy Award nominations—again for Best Supporting Actress—for The Spiral Staircase (1946), The Paradine Case (1947) and Pinky (1949). She was inducted into the Hollywood Walk of Fame on February 8, 1960 and is, along with her two brothers, included in the American Theater Hall of Fame.

Stage appearances

Filmography

Radio broadcasts

Notes and references

Notes

References

Sources

External links
 
 
 

Actress filmographies
American filmographies